The Renault Clio is a supermini car (B-segment), produced by French automobile manufacturer Renault. It was launched in 1990, and entered its fifth generation in 2019. The Clio has had substantial critical and commercial success, being consistently one of Europe's top-selling cars since its launch, and it is largely credited with restoring Renault's reputation and stature after a difficult second half of the 1980s. The Clio is one of only two cars, the other being the Volkswagen Golf, to have been voted European Car of the Year twice, in 1991 and 2006.

The car is named after Clio, one of the nine Muses in Greek mythology. In Japan, it is sold as the Renault Lutecia because Honda retains the rights to the name Clio after establishing the Honda Clio sales channel in 1984. Lutecia is derived from the name of Lutetia, an ancient Roman city that was the predecessor of Paris. The Renault Lutecia was formerly available through Yanase Co., Ltd., but in 1999 Renault purchased a stake in Japanese automaker Nissan. Following Renault's takeover, distribution rights for the Lutecia were handed over to Nissan locations in 2000 and sold at Nissan Red Stage locations.

First generation (1990) 

Renault had replaced its R5 supermini with a completely redesigned model (which had similar styling to the 1972 original) in 1984, but soon afterwards began working on an all-new supermini to take the company into the 1990s. It was eventually decided that the new car would feature a name designation, rather than the numeric model designations which Renault had traditionally used – this would be adopted across the entire Renault range by 1995. Cars like the Fuego coupe (launched in 1980) had been an exception to this rule, and the last "numeric" Renault was the 19, launched in 1988, and by the end of 1996 the numeric model designations had completely disappeared from the Renault range in Western Europe.

The Clio was introduced at the Paris Motor Show in June 1990 and sales in France and the rest of the continent began then, although sales in right-hand drive Britain did not begin until March 1991. The Clio was the replacement to the hugely successful Renault 5, although this car remained in production until 1996 at a factory in Slovenia, where some versions of the Clio were later built. The Clio's suspension and floorpan were largely the same as the R5, which was derived from the R9 saloon of 1981 and R11 hatchback of 1983 – not that of the original 1972 Renault 5, despite the later R5 visually resembling the original model.

The suspension uses half-width torsion bars (full-width on higher spec models) with trailing arms at the rear, and coil sprung MacPherson struts, attached to a thick pressed steel subframe at the front. The engine range available at launch included 1.2 L and 1.4 L E-type "Energy" petrol inline-four engines (first seen in the Renault 19) and 1.7 L and 1.9 L diesel engines, both based on the F-type unit. The petrol engines gradually had their carburettors replaced with electronic fuel injection systems by the end of 1992, in order to conform to ever stricter pollutant emission regulations brought in by the EEC.

A minor trim facelift occurred after only a year of being on sale. A new "smooth" version of the Renault diamond badge (the previous "ribbed" badge was being phased out at the time) and a new front seat design were the only changes. The altered design did not constitute a new "phase". In March 1994 (at the Geneva Motor Show), the phase two model was launched, with small updates to the exterior and interior of the Clio. Most noticeable was the change in the front grille from two metal ribs to a single colour-coded slat. The bump strips were made slightly larger and rounder and had the car's trim level badge incorporated into them. The badges on the tailgate strip were moved up onto the tailgate itself and the tailgate strip was given a carbon fibre look. The rear light clusters were given a slightly more rounded bubble shape, giving the Clio a more modern look. The clusters, however, are physically interchangeable with phase ones'.

In May 1996, with the arrival of the phase three facelifted Clio, the 1.2 L Energy engine was replaced by the 1,149 cc D7F MPi (multi point injection) DiET engine, first used in the Renault Twingo; for some time also, versions were available with the older 1239 cc "Cléon" unit from the original Twingo. The cylinder head design on the 1.4 L E-type was also slightly altered for the phase three models in a bid for better fuel economy. This resulted in the engines producing slightly less power than their earlier versions.

The phase three Clios have a slightly more noticeable update than the phase twos. The phase three has different, more rounded headlights, incorporating the turn signal in the unit with the headlight, and the bonnet curves more around the edges of the lights. The tailgate incorporates a third brake light and a new script "Clio" name badge, following the same typeface as contemporary Renaults. Some mechanical improvements were also made, as well as the introduction of side impact bars and airbags, which were now common features on mainstream cars across Europe.

Renault also released a hot hatch version of the Clio in 1991. It was aesthetically very similar, but with the addition of a  1.8 L eight-valve engine, side skirts and disc brakes on all wheels. This, with multi-point fuel injection, was badged as the RSi. From 1991 a lighter tuned version of this 1.8 litre engine (with single-point injection) joined the earlier 1.7 used in the very luxurious Baccara version which was sold in some continental European markets. In addition to this reasonably powerful engine, the Baccara has a luxurious interior with much leather and wood, as well as power windows, locks, etc. The Baccara was renamed "Initiale" in 1997, in line with other Renaults, differing from the Baccara mainly in the wheel design.

It was the successor to the Renault 5 GT Turbo, which was discontinued that year as the R5 range was pruned back. As well as having a higher top speed than a regular Clio, the 16S sports wider plastic front wings, an offset bonnet vent, wider rear arches and uprated suspension and brakes, and colour-coded front mirrors and bumpers. The RSi side skirts were omitted, however. Inside, the 16V model has an extended instrument panel that houses dials for engine oil pressure, oil temperature, and oil level (which only indicates on engine start). The seats are also more supportive to match the sporting nature of the model.

In December 1990, the Clio was voted European Car of the Year for 1991, and soon became one of Europe's best-selling cars, as well as the first Renault to be consistently among the top-10 best sellers in the United Kingdom, where it was selling in excess of 50,000 units a year by 1995. UK sales were helped by a famous television advertising campaign by Publicis shot in France, featuring the two main characters of Nicole (played by Estelle Skornik) and Papa.

From 1991 to 1993, trim levels were identical in every European country. Starting in 1993, trim levels designations became more varied across the various markets. The car was sold as the Renault Lutecia (from Lutetia, the Latin name for Paris) in Japan, as "Clio" was used there by Honda for one of their domestic marketing networks.

Clio Williams

In 1993, Renault launched the Clio Williams as a limited edition of 3,800 cars (1,300 more than they needed for homologation purposes) with each car bearing a numbered plaque on the dash. These sold out so quickly that Renault ended up building 1,600 more.

After the first series, due to the demand, Renault built the Williams 2 and 3, with more than 12,000 eventually being built. However, many new road cars were directly converted to race cars and when damaged replaced with another converted road car, which means that the actual number of road cars is significantly lower than the figures suggest.

The car was named after the then Renault-powered Formula One team WilliamsF1, though Williams had nothing to do with the design or engineering of this Clio. The modifications to the Clio 16S on which it was based were the work of Renault Sport, Renault's motorsport division. Nevertheless, this car had a Formula One link by being the sport's Safety Car in 1996.

It has a top speed of  equipped with performance-tuned ride and handling. Renault later released the Williams 2 and Williams 3 special editions, much to the chagrin of those owners who had been assured of the exclusivity of the "original" Williams. One common mistake people can make is thinking that the 2.0 16V (F7R) used in the Williams is simply a bored out 1.8 16V (F7P), whereas, in reality the large engine had different size valves, cams, stroked crank and engine oil cooler. Other differences between the Williams and the Clio 16S it is based on include a wider front track with wishbones similar, but not the same as the Renault 19, wider Speedline alloys, uprated (JC5) gearbox, bespoke four-to-one manifold, firmer suspension, and some cosmetic differences on the exterior and interior.

The differences between the three versions of the Williams were largely a reflection of phase changes across the Clio range, e.g. the gradual addition of enhanced safety features and cosmetic variations. Other than this, the Williams 1 and 2 had no sunroof and were painted in 449 Sports Blue. The final Williams 3 was painted in a slightly brighter shade of blue (432 Monaco Blue) and finally gained a sunroof which had long been standard on virtually all previous Clios. The original Williams was the lightest of the three, lacking the electrics necessary for the sunroof or the mirrors, and was the only one to support a metal plaque stating the build number.

The Renault Clio Williams was and still is a very popular rally car. The basic racing version (Gr.N) had racing suspension, different engine management, and a more free flowing exhaust. Roll cage was made by Matter France. Bucket seats were made by Sabelt.

Front brakes were also updated with 323 mm discs and four-pot Alcon brake calipers.

The final evolution was the Renault Clio Williams Maxi kit-car with wider arches and 17″ Speedline 2012 rims and improved Proflex suspension.

Engines

Second generation (BB/CB; 1998) 

Development of the X65 commenced in 1991, a year after the May 1990 launch of the Clio. In 1992, Pierre Beuzit became project manager of the X65 programme. In December 1993, a final design developed under Patrick Le Quément was approved, with development for production commencing, so in 1994 Renault rented a 129,600-square-foot building in Saint-Quentin-en-Yvelines, west of Paris. More than 600 people from Renault and its suppliers went to work there. The X65 project team became a laboratory for Renault's Guyancourt technical center. Forty teams were created, each responsible for a section of the car. In February 1997, management moved market launch by nearly a month from 15 March 1998 to 11 April 1998. Development ended in 1997, as pre-production units began to be constructed at Flins.

The second generation of the Clio was launched on 9 March 1998 and sold for less than €8,000, with considerably more rounded and bulbous styling than its predecessor. Part of the radical concept of the new Clio were many components made of unusual materials to save in weight and repair costs. For instance, the front wings were made of plastic (following criticisms of corrosion in this part of the previous model and based on technology developed for the Renault Espace) and the material of the bonnet was aluminium in some versions. Originally the engine lineup was similar to before, with 1.2 L, 1.4 L and 1.6 L petrol engines and a 1.9 L diesel. The project manager from 1992 to 1998 for the Clio II was Pierre Beuzit.

In early 2000, a sportive 16V version equipped with a new 1.6 L 16-valve engine was introduced, and eventually, all the older petrol engines were upgraded to more powerful and more economical 16-valve versions.

This was named the Clio Renault Sport 172 in the UK – 172 coming from the DIN method metric horsepower measurement. The standard Clio RTE powered with by the 1.2  engine could reach 160 km/h. Production was at the TWR factory in Sweden. Clio V6 production over three years was approximately 1513 vehicles with 256 sold in the UK.

In 2000, a few minor changes were made to the Clio range, which included revised specification levels, a new instrument cluster, and a passenger airbag fitted as standard for all models. The Clio achieved a four-star Euro NCAP rating in 2000, which was class-leading at the time.

In Japan, Renault was formerly licensed by Yanase Co., Ltd., but in 1999, Renault purchased a stake in Japanese automaker Nissan after Nissan had faced financial troubles following the collapse of the Japanese asset price bubble in 1991 and subsequent Lost Decade. As a result of Renault's purchase of interest, Yanase canceled its licensing contract with Renault in the spring of 2000, and Nissan took over as the sole licensee, hence sales of the Lutecia II in Japan were transferred from Yanase Store locations to Nissan Red Stage Store locations.

Electric Clio 
An electric version of the Clio was developed by Renault for an electric carshare project in Saint-Quentin-en-Yvelines in 1998. Fifty cars were produced, and could be charged by plugging in or by an induction pad located in some of the town's special locations. The electric Clio had a claimed top speed of 60 mph and a range of 35–40 miles. The scheme was branded Praxitèle and membership was charged at £10/month and around £3 for a 30-minute trip.

Phase 2

A major facelift occurred in June 2001 (Phase 2) which saw the exterior restyled (most visibly the headlights were made more angular), the interior quality improved with a new dashboard and centre console including the availability of digital climate control air-conditioning and satellite navigation on top models and a 1.5 L common rail Diesel engine added.

2003
Major revisions were made to the mid-engine 3.0 litre V6 model in line with the facelift introduced to the regular models in 2001 including revised frontal styling, new dashboard and higher equipment levels including climate control, cruise control and xenon headlights. Emissions are 285g/km and meet Euro IV standards 2 years before the implementation deadline. The chassis was also significantly revised with a slightly longer wheelbase and revised suspension together with larger 18 inch alloy wheels. For the Phase 2 V6, production was transferred from TWR's Swedish factory to the dedicated Renault Sport Alpine factory at Dieppe in Northern France. Production from 2003 to the end of 2005 was approximately 1309 vehicles of which 354 were sold in the UK.

On ordinary cars, an interior equipment specification change was made from this model year – fitment of a CD player as standard (as opposed to cassette) on Expression and Dynamique. It remained optional on Authentique and its Rush derivative.

Phase 3

In 2004, Phase 3 followed starting on a 53 Plate, this was just some small changes to bring it up to date. The front bumper was changed giving it a wide lower grille and the foglights were bulged out at the side (cars not equipped with foglights remained using the older ph2 bumper), the upper grille was changed and the headlights (which previously had black background) now had grey. The 15" alloy wheels were changed and were now a 15" version of the facelift 172 model on Dynamique and Extreme models. Clear side repeaters were added, as was a colourcoded rear spoiler (again on Dynamique spec cars). In the South American market, the facelifted Clio continued to use the dashboard of the 1998 model and was never updated, except for the Colombian 2008 model that included the same interior of the European version with little changes, and continued having the same exterior as the phase II model.

On the inside the pattern on the seats was changed for a simpler one, and the dials were changed to do away with the fuel and water temperature needles and now featured a larger screen that included a digital version of these gauges as well as the mileage and trip computer. Climate control equipped cars were given a vent in the back of the glove box so it could be climate controlled. Under the bonnet a new  dCi engine was available (the 1.2 16v also received a new engine developed with Nissan). Rear disks were fitted on 1.6 16v models and DCi 100 models equipped with ESP. For the first time there were two options in chassis stiffness for the R.S. model. the standard Settings (different from the non-sport models), and CUP badge chassis, 20 mm lower, larger stabilizer bars, and stiffer suspension with dark graphite alloy wheels.

At the 2006 Paris International Agricultural Show, Renault exhibited a Hi-Flex Clio II with a 1.6 L 16-valve engine. This vehicle, which addresses the Brazilian market, features Renault-developed flex-fuel technology, with a highly versatile engine that can run on fuel containing a blend of petrol and ethanol in any proportion (0% to 100% of either).

Phase 4 / 5

The Phase 4 Clio II, known as the Clio Campus, was introduced in 2006 and had a restyled rear end, the number plate moving from boot to bumper, and a better specification on all models. This car stopped being sold in the UK in late 2008, and a revised front end was then released in April 2009 (Phase 5).

The last units of the Clio II built in Mexico featured the headlights used on the Nissan Platina, thus becoming the third headlight design to be used in the car. This version lasted a month (January 2010) on sale, before both the Clio and Platina being replaced by the Logan and Sandero due to quality issues. The second generation Clio was marketed until 2012 in France as the Clio Campus, or in Slovenia as the Clio Storia. It is still marketed in Colombia also as Clio Campus since 2012, with the same interior as the pre-facelifted model and a very basic equipment, without airbags or foglights.

Phase 6

In October 2012, a new version of the Clio II, called Clio Mío, was introduced at the São Paulo Motor Show, featuring the brand's new design theme. Intended to be the lowest priced Renault model available in Latin America, it was manufactured in Córdoba, Argentina, and featured additional styling and equipment updates. It kept the dashboard of the pre-facelift version, but with new gauges and optional colour matching inserts.

As of 2015, it contained about 40% Argentine parts.

The Phase 6 Clio II was also offered in Maghreb, where it kept the name Clio Campus. It was finally retired from production in October 2016.

Safety
The Clio Mio in its most basic version for Latin America with no airbags received 0 stars for adult occupants and 1 star for infants from Latin NCAP in 2013.

Sedan

In 1999, Renault launched the saloon version of the Clio II, named Clio Symbol in Turkey and Eastern Europe, Thalia in Central Europe, Clio Classic in Asia and North Africa, Clio Sedan in Brazil and Paraguay, or Symbol in the rest of South America (except Argentina where it was called Clio). The car was intended for sale in developing countries, where saloons were traditionally preferred over hatchbacks, most notably in Eastern Europe, where the Thalia was cheaper than the Clio, but was still about 30% more expensive than the Dacia Logan, also sold by Renault as a low cost model. In some Latin American markets the sedan was offered as the Nissan Platina (manufactured in Aguascalientes, Mexico), with slight changes in the front of the car to make it resemble the Nissan Altima. The sedan version of the Clio was facelifted in 2002, with new exterior similar to the facelifted Clio, better equipment and safety levels.

In the fall of 2006, an improved Clio sedan has been offered, renamed in Eastern Europe as Renault Symbol. This model featured the interior of the facelifted Clio II with very minor parts commonality with Megane II, as well as new standard and optional equipment, such as automatic air conditioning and a CD player. The model earned moderate reception in the domestic market.

Renault introduced the second generation of the Symbol model at the 2008 Moscow Motor Show. This new model featured chrome-trimmed front grille and rear fascia, while powered by similar engines as the Dacia Logan range. It was designed for the Eastern and Central Europe, Russia, Turkey and North Africa, and it was also manufactured in Argentina for South America.

Watchdog controversy
In April 2006, the BBC's consumer affairs programme Watchdog aired details of over 1,000 incidents involving Clio IIs in which the bonnet flew open without warning while still being driven, usually at high speeds, and sometimes writing the cars off. The problem was found to be caused by the catch not being cleaned and lubricated during servicing causing it to stick in the open position. Renault investigated the issue with the aid of the Vehicle and Operator Services Agency (VOSA) and a "task force" of Renault departments to test the design but found no problem with the bonnet catch and so would not issue a recall. Renault instead wrote to owners of the model and offered to "remedy for free any catches where there has been poor maintenance".

Watchdog has since claimed other experts have contacted them with accusations that Renault was expecting people to maintain a flawed part that would corrode over time and could cost lives. David Burrowes, MP, Chair of the Government's Road Safety Group, later tabled a motion in the House of Commons urging further action. Renault was accused by its Press Relations Manager Graeme Holt, who quit in protest, of downplaying the serious "fault" and putting customers' lives in danger.

Engines

Third generation (BR/CR/SB/SR; 2005) 

The third generation Clio was unveiled at the 2005 Frankfurt Motor Show.

The Clio III uses the Nissan B platform, co-developed with Nissan (which Renault has a share in), that is shared with the Renault Modus, the Nissan Micra, and the Nissan Note.

This was the result of a decision to move the Clio upmarket. It also brings the trademark "Renault Card" keyless immobiliser to the Clio for the first time.  The Clio III achieved a 5-star EuroNCAP safety rating. Sales began throughout Europe in October 2005.

Clio came with several trims, with the Dynamique having the most variations as it comes with 4 versions, namely the Dynamique, Dynamique S, Dynamique SX and Dynamique TomTom. The Clio Dynamique S comes with 4-wheel disc brakes and 16-inch alloys. Several options were offered, with others that could be added later on, like a sport exhaust made by Sebring, or rear "becquet" (spoiler), to provide a sporty look.

It was voted European Car of the Year 2006, becoming the first car to win twice, defeating the rival Volkswagen Passat by just 5 points. The Clio was described by several people as the new benchmark for its category and by one judge as a "great little car that should inspire bigger ones". The trophy for the award was presented in January 2006 to the Renault chief executive at a ceremony in Italy organized by Auto Magazine.

In June 2006 the sales of the third generation Clio Renault Sport started in France for the price of €23,000. The Clio Renault Sport is equipped with a new naturally aspirated 16-valve 2.0 L engine based on the earlier version used in the second generation Clio Renault Sport and a 6-speed manual gearbox. The engine develops  at 7250 rpm.

An estate version called Sport Tourer in the UK was unveiled in March 2007. All Clio Estate were built in Turkey by Oyak-Renault. In the 2nd, 3rd and 4th gears over 4500 rpm the turbocharger adds 5 extra HP.

Unlike its predecessors, the Japanese-spec Renault Lutecia III was not available at any Yanase Co., Ltd. dealership location, as Yanase had ended its import rights for Renault after Renault had acquired a stake in Nissan when the Lutecia II was still in production. Instead, the Renault Lutecia III was sold exclusively through Nissan Red Stage Store locations.

Facelift

2009 

A facelifted version of the Clio III went on sale in the United Kingdom on 15 May 2009.

It features better quality materials used in the interior and is better equipped than the pre-facelift model.

It is also introduced with a new Clio R.S. variant, intended to slot between the regular Clio and the Clio 182 R.S..

The Clio GT has a new aggressive front end styling incorporating a black grille, extended side sills, suspension settings unique to the R.S. variant, and a twin tailpipe design with a lip spoiler on the rear end.

The Renault Clio III also became the basis for the Renault Clio Gordini 20–34 (limited edition) introduced in the United Kingdom in 2010. The Clio Gordini 200 is equipped with a 2.0L F4R engine which develops . However, the limited edition is priced as low as the usual version.

The range was reduced in late 2012, due to the launch of the Clio IV. However, in France and Spain it remained in the range as the Clio Collection and was in production until 2014.

Engines

Fourth generation (BH/KH; 2012) 

The Clio IV was first featured in a Facebook post from September 2011 by Renault which was deleted afterward, with Autoblog calling it a "concept car".

The production model was introduced at the September–October 2012 Paris Motor Show, and began marketing a month later. It is available in hatchback body style and starting from early 2013 also as an estate. It is manufactured in Flins, France, and in Bursa, Turkey (main production site), where the estate will particularly be assembled.

The Clio IV is only available with five doors, with "hidden" rear door handles near the windows. Another notable difference from the previous generation is the wheelbase, which has been significantly extended and is now near to the one of a compact car. The length and the width have also been increased, but less significantly.

The R.S. version was launched in Mexico in 2014, and was the only French-made product in Renault's Mexican lineup.

A brief time line for the Clio IV (based on the French market)
 Phase 1
Produced from October 2012 to August 2016.

 Phase 2
Produced from August 2016 to April 2019.

 Génération
Produced from April 2019 to 2020.

 October 2012: Introduced with Authentique, Expression and Dynamique
 March 2013: Introduced Estate (Authentique, Expression and Dynamique)
 April 2013: Renamed to Life, ZEN and Intens also added GT.
 September 2013: Added dCi EDC
 January 2014: Added 1.2 16V (D4F) GPL
 October 2014: Added Initial Paris
 March 2015: Added GT-Line (Pack Option), added Ivory paint and deleted Yellow.  
 July 2015: Minor update for dashboard and steering wheel for Intens.
 April 2016: GT discontinued.
 August 2016: Introduced Phase 2.
 May 2018: Added 0.9 TCe 75.
 July 2018: Reorganize version to Trend, Limited and Intens.
 April 2019: After the commercialization of the Clio V, the Clio IV continues to be produced under the designation "Clio Génération" with only two engine options; 0.9L TCe 70 and TCe 90.

Clio R.S.
Revealed at the 2012 Paris Motor Show, the fourth-generation model eliminates manual transmission in favor of a 6-speed EDC dual-clutch transmission (Efficient Double Clutch) developed by Renault Sport engineers. It is available exclusively as a five-door model for the first time.

In 2016 Renault released a face-lifted version featuring new LED headlights and other minor improvements. There's also a Trophy version that has an improved engine that produces  and   In 2018, Renault released a limited edition R.S. 18. This model is only available in black with livery inspired by the colour scheme of the company's Formula 1 race car.

Features
The Clio IV features new equipment such as hands-free, rear camera connectivity with more than 50 applications (Renault R-Link 7-inch infotainment system, powered by Android & TomTom) and a six-speed dual-clutch transmission that will be available starting early 2013.

Engines
A turbocharged 1.6-litre four-cylinder engine, capable of producing , will be featured on the Renault Sport version.

Facelift

Phase 2 

In August 2016, the Phase 2 was launched. This introduced a mild cosmetic refresh including new LED headlights and tail lights (standard on high spec models and optional on mid spec), restyled front and rear bumpers, new alloy wheel designs, LED front fog lights and a new front grille. Inside, Clio received a retrimmed steering wheel, updated versions of the MediaNav and R-Link systems (including the addition of DAB digital radio), new interior door panels including a new 4-way mirror adjustment control (the first time this saw a new design since Clio II), and a new gear knob.

In 2018, the Clio IV range for the UK market was significantly condensed. The trim levels were reduced to: Play, Iconic and GT-Line. The 1.6-litre R.S. model was dropped from the lineup, as were both 1.2-litre petrol engines and the 110 hp diesel. This left the engine range at the 0.9 TCe petrol engine available with either 75 hp or 90 hp, and the 1.5 dCi 90 hp diesel.

In France, despite being replaced by the fifth generation in 2019, the Clio IV (marketed as Renault Clio Génération) remained on offer until August 2020. It is still manufactured in Turkey for some markets until May 2021. After this date, the Clio IV only stays assembled in Algeria for the domestic market.

Fifth generation (BF; 2019)

The fifth generation model was unveiled at the 2019 Geneva Motor Show. It is the first model to use the CMF-B HS platform, shared with the second-generation Renault Captur and Nissan Juke among others. The car is the first not to be made in France, instead it is produced in Slovenia and Turkey.

Facelift
Renault is preparing a facelift for the Clio V to be presented in the spring of 2023.

Equipment
The new model comes with an interior that uses higher quality material and finishes (for higher trim levels), sporty seats, a large 9.3-inch touch screen display (with the Easy Link system, compatible with Android Auto and Apple CarPlay and featuring Google Maps and TomTom navigation), customizable driver screen (instrument cluster) that utilizes TFT display, a redesigned, more compact steering wheel, electric parking brake on higher trim levels, a wireless smartphone charger, full-LED headlights, hands free parking, 360-degree system of four cameras, lane keeping assistant, adaptive cruise control and road sign recognition, blind spot warning and automatic emergency braking.

Powertrain
The car is available with many choices of engines & gearboxes. The new modular CMF-B platform also helps to improve efficiency in the new Clio, which offers the option of a hybrid powertrain for the first time. Available from 2020, the E-Tech hybrid drivetrain combines a new-generation 1.6-litre petrol engine with two electric motors, a multi-mode gearbox, and a 1.2-kWh battery. No exact specs of the Clio E-Tech have been released but the hybrid setup is said to provide "maximum efficiency in use with class-leading responsiveness, limited energy waste and quick battery charging when decelerating".

The conventional engine lineup includes new turbocharged petrol (1.0 TCe 100 and 1.3 TCe 130) engines, along with the naturally aspirated 1.0 SCe, as well as the Blue dCi 1.5-litre diesel with an output of 85 hp. In total, customers will be able to choose from nine engine/gearbox combinations.

Advertising
 In the United Kingdom, the Clio was advertised on television using the characters "Nicole" (a flirtatious young French woman played by Estelle Skornik) and "Papa" (her somewhat slow-witted father played by Max Douchin). The 1994 advert featured Vincent Cassel as Nicole's boyfriend. The commercials were very popular, with the final instalment of the series featuring comedy double act Bob Mortimer and Vic Reeves, in a sequence parodying The Graduate. In 2000, the 1991 commercial "Interesting" was named the 12th best television commercial of all time, in a poll conducted by The Sunday Times and Channel 4. Sound clips of the advert were played repeatedly on The Chris Moyles Show when it was discovered Comedy Dave and his girlfriend had named their newborn daughter Nicole.
 In 1999, a television advert was launched worldwide for the Renault Clio MTV Limited edition featuring a man who was saying  "Get up ah!" all the time, it was actually the only sound he can hear from a Clio passing in front of his house early in the morning, then the advert shows the five men inside the Clio and moving their heads to the rhythm of the James Brown song "Get Up (I Feel Like Being a) Sex Machine". Same advertising made in Argentina with the Clio II in 2000 with this song.
 The Clio II advertising campaign featured French model Hélène Mahieu, and French international footballer Thierry Henry for the Clio II facelift, both attempting to define the term va-va-voom, a term later defined by the Oxford English Dictionary as "The quality of being exciting, vigorous, or sexually attractive", although they state that it dates from the 1950s. In Brazil, the Clio had a trim level called Va Va Voom. The trim level has been discontinued. In Mexico, The Clio II's latest campaign reads "todo por mi Clio" (anything for my Clio), depicting one would give anything to keep one's Clio safe from danger.
 The Renault Clio R.S. 200 EDC hatchback was one of the many vehicles that can be unlocked in Asphalt 8 with a certain amount of coins in the game.
 The latest campaign to date for the Clio was for the Renault Clio III, which featured French actress Annelise Hesme and English actor Jeremy Sheffield as Sophie and Ben (respectively), trying to outdo each other over the superiority of each nation via a range of cultural aspects. This "France Vs Britain" (French car, British designers) campaign has been extended across a number of media, for example the "French Film, British Cinemas" tag for the annual Renault French Film Festival. The music used is Nina Simone's "Sinnerman".

Motorsport

The Clio has competed in various well-known races and championships such as the Spa 24 hours and British GT. The car competed in the Spa 24 hour race in 1991, 1992, 1993, 1995, 1999 and 2000. Atlanta Motorsport competed in the GT Cup class in 2003 and 2004, both times at Donington Park. The Clio has also been entered in the Nürburgring 24 Hours and Zolder 24 Hours with varying amounts of success.

In 2001, Rob Collard entered the BTCC with a Renault Clio in the Production class, which were made up of slower, smaller cars like the Peugeot 306 GTi, the Ford Focus and Honda Accord. Throughout the season, Collard was a common contender in the middle of the field in most races. He was often seen amongst the lower-scoring Peugeot 306s like Tom Boardman and Paul O'Neill. At the end of the season, despite not participating in nine races and getting only eight finishes, initially, he finished 12th with 51 points, but due to a penalty of 5 points, his final position in the championship standings was 13th with 46 points. He scored one podium in the first race at Snetterton, with a 5th-place finish.

In 2002, Collard entered again with the Clio for the next season. Unfortunately, out of the ten races he was entered in, he only started four, with the three he finished resulted in him ending up on the podium with a 2nd place in class (7th overall) and a 1st place in class (9th overall) at the first event of the season. After four non-starts at Oulton Park and Thruxton, Collard finished 2nd in class (14th overall) at Silverstone in the first race, later retiring from the second. His last entry in the Clio was at Croft where he didn't start either race. By the end of the season, he initially had 39 points, but 5 were redacted, he remained in his 12th-place finish in the championship standings with 34 points.

Rallying

Versions of the mark-five Clio, the Renault Clio Rally4 and the Renault Clio Rally5, have been produced by Renault Sport for the Rally4 and Rally5 tiers of the Fédération Internationale de l'Automobile's Rally Pyramid. Both are  wider than their consumer counterpart, which is  taller than the rally versions.
A rallycross variant also exists.

Awards
 European Car of the Year in 1991
 European Car of the Year in 2006
 What Car? "Supermini of the Year" 2006
 Winner of El Mejor Automóvil Subcompacto (Best supermini) on Automóvil Panamericano magazine in 2002, 2003 and 2004 in Mexico

References

External links

  (UK)

2000s cars
2010s cars
2020s cars
Cars introduced in 1990
Cars of Turkey
Euro NCAP superminis
Latin NCAP superminis
Front-wheel-drive vehicles
Plug-in hybrid vehicles
Hot hatches
Rally cars
Clio
Sedans
Station wagons
Subcompact cars
Touring cars
Production electric cars